Bench used in a legal context can have several meanings. First, it can simply indicate the location in a courtroom where a judge sits. Second, the term bench is a metonym used to describe members of the judiciary collectively, or the judges of a particular court, such as the King's Bench or the Common Bench in England and Wales, or the federal bench in the United States. Third, the term is used to differentiate judges, who are referred to as "the bench", from attorneys or barristers, who are referred to as "the bar". The phrase "bench and bar" denotes all judges and lawyers collectively.

The historical roots of the term come from judges formerly having sat on long seats or benches (freestanding or against a wall) when presiding over a court. The bench is usually an elevated desk area that allows a judge to view, and to be seen by, the entire courtroom. The bench was a typical feature of the courts of the Order of St. John in Malta, such as at the Castellania, where judges and the nominated College of Advocates sat for court cases and review laws.

See also
 Bank
 Bar (law)
 Bench trial
 Bencher
 En banc
 Full court

References

Sources 

 The Art of Writing Judgments, Hon’ble Shri M. A. Bakshi, Vice President, ITAT, Chandigarh Bench
 Conduct on and off the Bench, Hon’ble Shri P. P. Parikh, Vice President, ITAT, Hyderabad Bench

Courts
Judiciaries